Sally Doty (born December 22, 1966) is an American attorney and politician who served as the Republican member of the Mississippi Senate, representing the 39th District from 2012 to 2020.

Early life and education 
Born in Kosciusko, Mississippi, Doty graduated from Kosciusko High School in 1984. She is a graduate of Mississippi University for Women and earned a Juris Doctor from the Mississippi College School of Law.

Career 
Doty led numerous bipartisan legislative efforts during her two terms in the state senate. As chair of the elections committee, Doty authored and passed campaign finance reform prohibiting elected officials from spending campaign funds for personal use. She spearheaded a contentious multi-year effort to provide protections for victims of domestic violence through the reform of Mississippi's divorce laws. She served in a leadership position on Governor Phil Bryant's Teen Pregnancy Task Force and authored legislation to require Mississippi Community Colleges to develop a plan to address unplanned pregnancy. However, her attempt to modernize sex education requirements during the 2016 legislative session was unsuccessful.

Doty chaired the Mississippi Senate Energy Committee. She served as one of give Senators appointed by the Lieutenant Governor to the Joint Legislative Budget Committee. She served as Vice-Chair of Judiciary A, and is a member of the following committees: Finance, Economic Development, Banking and Financial Institutions, Public Health, Highways and Transportation, Public Property, and Drug Policy.

In the spring of 2018, Doty was a candidate in the Republican primary for the United States House of Representatives to fill the seat held by retiring Rep. Gregg Harper (MS-3).

Doty was appointed by Gov. Tate Reeves to the executive director position of the Mississippi Public Utilities Staff; she resigned from her senate seat on July 16, 2020.

References

External links
Mississippi State Senate - Sally Doty official government website

Campaign site
Sally Doty at Ballotpedia

1966 births
Living people
People from Kosciusko, Mississippi
People from Brookhaven, Mississippi
Mississippi University for Women alumni
Mississippi College School of Law alumni
Republican Party Mississippi state senators
Women state legislators in Mississippi
21st-century American politicians
21st-century American women politicians